Mukumbura is a village in the Mt Darwin District, located in the Mashonaland Central Province of Zimbabwe, Southern Africa.

Effects of War

Protection Villages 
Arising out of the war situation was the strategic resettlement of almost a quarter of a million African people in Rhodesia into protected/consolidated villages which dictated many aspects of people's lives. This resettlement was called Operation Overload. By the end of 1974, multiple protected and consolidated villages were set up, and this included the Mukumbura Protected Village that had three closely knit fenced-on camps, holding around 4,300 people. Mukumbura was chosen as a prime exemplar and regarded as showpieces by the Government to show to journalists and other important visitors how the Government has implemented and maintained protection for its people. Some of the local women were also trained by the administration as community workers in order to teach simple domestic skills to the women in these protected villages.

Demographic 
As a consequence of the landmines and the danger that they present when encountered, many people are living in a constant fear that is breeding uncertainties in the future of those settled in the area. This safety issue that is impacting individuals, as well as prospects for development, is pushing residents to move and settle in safer places, such as Rushinga and Mutare communal areas, that are becoming increasingly densely populated due to this. Naturally, Mukumbura has faced a growing underpopulation as a landmine-infested area.

Geography 
The area of Mukumbura and characterised with a semi-arid climate with rainfall amounting to less than 650 mm. The low rainfall combined with the high temperatures (over 25 degrees Celsius) means that there is a limited amount of surface water resources even throughout normal seasons. The land itself is primarily flat, locally dissected and stony. It contains the active floodplain of the Mukumbura river and the slightly higher situated fluvial terrace. The soil is mainly residual, well drained, shallow to moderately deep fine grained sandloams over brown to yellowish red sand.

Economy 
As a remote and marginal area of Zimbabwe, it is evident that Mukumbura is categorised as "poverty stricken and limited in socio-economic growth”. Acting as the border crossing between Mozambique and Zimbabwe, women usually take advantage of their proximity to Mozambique to acquire second hand goods from Mozambique at a lower price and resell them in Zimbabwe at a higher price that then allows them to maximise profits. Regardless of being a poor community, they have been taught and appreciated the teaching of working talents. Men and women tend to undertake small businesses in order to sustain themselves at the very least in the current economic hardships of Zimbabwe.

Agriculture 

The major economic activities of Mukumbura are livestock farming and crop production which are also done typically for subsistence. The area of Mukumbura lies within a region that is determined as a ‘semi-extensive farming’ region, presented through the Zimbabwean agro-ecological classification. With its low and uncertain rainfall, cash cropping is not entirely suited in this climate unless in extremely favourable localities, particularly those situated along the main river courses. In general, the soils are sandy and contain an acidic pH as a result of poor management by the farmers that take part in constant cultivation without replenishment of nutrients. Farming systems is thereby primarily based around the production of livestock and can be assisted and paired with the growing of drought-resistant fodder crops. The main crops grown in the Mukumbura areas and communal lands include millets, maize, tobacco, sorghum, cowpeas and beans which are determined by the topo-climatic conditions of the area. Cattle are mainly used to plough the fields.

Surveys carried out in Mukumbura areas found that farmers were able to identify Striga asiatica, a parasitic weed, and its variants present within their fields and soil. The parasitic plants had many plant host including cow peas, common beans, maize, sorghum, millets, tobacco and Ricardia scabra. As this represents all the crop plants that are cultivated by the farmers in these areas, the farmers’ food security are at a serious risk and threat by these parasitic weeds which latch onto the roots of the host plants, leading to reduced yields or complete crop failure.

Water and Sanitation 

Water sources can be unsafe due to the underground planted landmines that contribute to environmental pollution. Subsequently, the majority of the water used in these areas is contaminated, and without precaution exposes people to health hazards from its consumption.  Sources of water for domestic purposes and cooking for rural people then tend to be mainly from wells, boreholes and rivers. However, there is decreased reliability of these water sources during the dry seasons as a result of many factors, with reduced groundwater being one of them. During the dry season, live stock is also watered from the boreholes. Furthermore, Water Point Committees (WPCs), which are local community management groups, exist for all the area's boreholes. WPCs are the lowest institution in the management of rural water supply. It is claimed that these committees are not entirely effective in managing the maintenance and operation of the boreholes because of reasons such as poor record keeping and incapability to mobilise the community when the boreholes breakdown.

In 2003, an international Non-Government Organisation implemented a new water supply project for the Mukumbura communal lands. The objective and intent of the water project was to increase accessibility to water and thereby reduce water borne diseases. The project outlook planned to rehabilitate 52 of the non-functional boreholes in Mukumbura while also drilling 21 new boreholes.

Tourism 
The area of Sheba forest, Musengezi border posts and Mukumbura, that are densely populated with landmines, have a potential of attracting tourists as a result of their significant historical sites, favourable and pleasant weather, perennial rivers and small to medium game parks. Areas that have been infested with landmines become an obstacle and defer these potential tourist activities that would help generate foreign currency for the country and village.

Mukumbura Border Post 
Mukumbura Border Control lies between Zimbabwe and Mozambique. Mecumbira is situated on the Mozambican side of the border. On each side, the borders are separated by the Rio Mukumbura River. It was reported in mid 2012 that there was little activity at the border post and that the perimeter fence between the two counties was washed away as a result of the Mukumbura River flooding. The border operates from 6am-6pm (GMT+2). When visiting and entering Zimbabwe, all visitors are required to present a valid passport, and original vehicle registration papers and license when travelling with a vehicle. If the visitor is driving a vehicle not their own, they must provide an affidavit signed by the owner that authorises its use by another person as well as third party insurance. Payments in USD or ZAR are made for road access fees that are based on vehicle size, and a carbon pollution fee.

In Popular Culture

Mukumbura was immortalized in the song "It's a Long Way to Mukumbura" by Mike Westcott and Leprechaun. The 1977 song is set to the music of British song "It's a Long Way to Tipperary". It rose to #2 on the Rhodesian hit music charts. The song expressed, in humorous form, the physical distance to Mukumbura from other parts of the country while also celebrating the contributions made by different branches of the Rhodesian armed forces to the Rhodesian Bush War.

References

Populated places in Mashonaland Central Province